Theater Oberhausen  is a theatre in Oberhausen, North Rhine-Westphalia, Germany.

External links

1920 establishments in Germany
Buildings and structures in Oberhausen
Music venues completed in 1920
Theatres completed in 1920
Theatres in North Rhine-Westphalia